Xiropigado is a village in the municipality of North Kynouria, in eastern Arcadia, Greece. It has 353 inhabitants and is a small seaside resort, located on the eastern slopes of mountain Zavitsa, only 10 kilometres away from nearby Astros and 150 kilometres from Athens.

See also
List of settlements in Arcadia

References

Populated places in Arcadia, Peloponnese